NADPH oxidase, EF-hand calcium binding domain 5, also known as NOX5, is a protein which in humans is encoded by the NOX5 gene.

Function 

NOX5 is a novel NADPH oxidase that generates superoxide.

Nox5 interacts with c-abl, superoxide production leads to phosphorylation of c-abl, while inhibition of c-abl kinase activity inhibits Nox5 superoxide production.

References

Further reading

EF-hand-containing proteins